Guam Station is the name of several railroad stations in South Korea.

 Guam Station (Daejeon)
 Guam Station (Daegu)